U. T. Khader is an Indian politician from Karnataka who, since June 2018, has served as the Cabinet Minister for Urban Development and Housing.

Khader is a fourth-term MLA representing the Mangalore constituency (previously known as the Ullal and Boliyar constituency) of the Karnataka Legislative Assembly. He is a member of the Indian National Congress and was the only Congress MLA to win from the Dakshina Kannada and Udupi districts in the 2018 State election. He defeated Santosh Kumar Rai of BJP by a margin of 19,739 votes.

Early life
Khader was born and brought up in Mangalore ullal Boliyar. His mother is Naseema and his father is the late Haji U. T. Fareed. He has two sons and three daughters.

Political career
He was the Minister for Health and Family Welfare of Karnataka from 20 May 2013 to 20 June 2016 as part of the Siddaramaiah cabinet.

Khader is now serving as the deputy opposition leader of the Karnataka legislative assembly.

References 

Article published on 30th January on The hindu news paper

External links 
U. T. Khadar affidavit

Living people
State cabinet ministers of Karnataka
Politicians from Mangalore
Karnataka MLAs 2018–2023
Indian National Congress politicians from Karnataka
1969 births
Karnataka MLAs 2008–2013
Karnataka MLAs 2013–2018
Karnataka MLAs 2004–2007